The Arenillas River is a river in El Oro Province, Ecuador.

See also
List of rivers of Ecuador

References

 Rand McNally, The New International Atlas, 1993.
  GEOnet Names Server 
 Water Resources Assessment of Ecuador 

Rivers of Ecuador